Terrapin Station is the ninth studio album (fourteenth overall) by the Grateful Dead, released July 27, 1977. It was the first Grateful Dead album on Arista Records and the first studio album after the band returned to live touring, following a nearly two-year hiatus.

The album reached  28 on the Billboard Album Chart and achieved gold album status in 1987, after being released for the first time on CD (by Arista Records) following the release of that year's In the Dark. Terrapin Station was remastered and expanded for the Beyond Description (1973–1989) box set in October 2004.

It was voted number 848 in the third edition of Colin Larkin's All Time Top 1000 Albums (2000).

Recording
With the folding of their own record label and a change in management, the Grateful Dead signed with recently founded Arista Records.  Label head Clive Davis had been interested in working with the band since his time at Columbia Records and had previously signed their colleagues New Riders of the Purple Sage. He added the Dead to the label with the agreement that they work under an outside producersomething they had not tried on a studio album since 1968's Anthem of the Sun (though 1970's American Beauty had been co-produced by engineer Stephen Barncard). Keith Olsen was chosen to produce and the band temporarily moved to Los Angeles, as Olsen preferred to work at Sound City, where he had recently achieved success producing Fleetwood Mac's 1975 comeback album.

Lyricist Robert Hunter wrote the lyrics for the first part of the "Terrapin Station" suite in a single sitting, during a rare Bay Area lightning storm. On the same day, driving across the Richmond–San Rafael Bridge, lead guitarist Jerry Garcia was struck by the idea for a singular melodic line. He turned his car around and hurried home to set it down in notation before it escaped him. Hunter said "When we met the next day, I showed him the words and he said, 'I've got the music.' They dovetailed perfectly and Terrapin edged into this dimension." He based the lyrics for the "Lady with a Fan" section on a traditional English folk song known variously as "The Lady of Carlisle", "The Bold Lieutenant" and "The Lion's Den". The ballad is No. 396 on the Roud Folk Song Index. It is also O 25 on the Laws list, which synopsizes "The lady decides to choose between two brothers who love her by determining which is braver. She tosses her fan into a lion's den and asks them to retrieve it." Hunter, who was also influenced by Sir Walter Scott, had composed "Terrapin Station" in two parts, the second never recorded or performed by the Grateful Dead.

Drummer Bill Kreutzmann ironed out the arrangement, explaining "We sat down and mapped it out. I said, 'This is how the song goes.' I showed [Mickey] all the parts that I felt worked really well, he added a couple, and that's what the song is today. We went back into the studio the next night and got it right. With the drum parts worked out, everything else snapped together like puzzle pieces."

Rhythm guitarist Bob Weir's "Estimated Prophet" was written in septuple time. His lyrics for the song (finished with writing partner John Barlow) examine a character's delusions of grandeur and California's propensity for false prophets. The song also quotes "Ezekiel Saw the Wheel". Drummer Bill Kreutzmann said "It's a great song but when [Weir] brought it to us, something was off. It needed a groove. It was in quick  but it didn't swing. Yet. For my homework that night, I combined two fast sevens and played half-time over it. But that's getting technical. In layman's terms, 'Estimated Prophet' suddenly grooved."

"Dancin' in the Streets" is a cover of Martha & the Vandellas' "Dancing in the Street" from the early days of the band, given a new arrangement that prominently features singer Donna Godchaux. For the studio version, a funk-influenced guitar figure was added to a four-on-the-floor disco beat and polished with a commercial production contemporary to the era. The highly orchestrated "Sunrise" was Donna's first singing-songwriting effort for the Grateful Dead. (She and band pianist Keith Godchaux had written the songs for their duo effort Keith & Donna two years prior, on Dead spin-off label Round Records.) The song has been acknowledged as a tribute to the band's recently deceased road manager, Rex Jackson, for whom the Dead's charitable Rex Foundation was later named.

Bassist Phil Lesh's "Passenger" was inspired by Fleetwood Mac's "Station Man". The lyrics were written by ordained Buddhist monk Peter Zimels. However, as Lesh had stopped singing during this period due to vocal cord damage from improper singing technique, Weir and Donna Godchaux sang lead for both the recording and when it was later added to live set lists. Weir's "Samson & Delilah" was a new arrangement of Reverend Gary Davis's traditional song, retelling the story from the Tanakh. Weir had taken several guitar lessons from Davis at his Queens, New York, home prior to his death in 1972.

Olsen had a method for reining in the Dead: "During the cutting of the basic tracks it was pretty hard to get every member of the band in the studio at the same time ... so [Steve] Parish went out to the hardware store and got these giant nails and a great big hammer and as soon as everybody was in, he hammered the door shut from the inside ... we didn't have drifters from the other studios coming in to listen. We didn't have people leaving to go screw around elsewhere. We started getting work done." With Fleetwood Mac, Olsen had a hands-on approach, orchestrating the addition of Lindsey Buckingham and Stevie Nicks and influencing song choice, arrangements and sequencing. He entered the Grateful Dead project with similar expectations, imagining a concept album or song cycle. Olsen said that Davis told him "I need a commercial record out of them." This caused some friction during the sessions as well as with the end results. Kreutzmann said "He'd have us play the same thing over and over again, and we're not really the type of band that can put up with that. ... Our very identity is based on the opposite principle."

Production
The final overdubs were recorded at Automated Sound in New York City while the Dead toured the region. Olsen then added strings, horns and choirs to the tracks at studios in London, unrequested by the band. For "Estimated Prophet", Donna's vocals were multi-tracked and he had Tom Scott add lyricon and saxophone. In a further quest for commercial potential, he ignored other contributions. Kreutzmann commented

Weir likewise felt "All the orchestration and choral stuff was given too much prominence ... so we began this long negotiation, as it were, to put it in a more reasonable perspective. Keith was real stokedhe'd gone over to England and gotten these parts ... I thought it had to be backpedaled considerably. Keith said 'I'm going to bring Tom Scott in' ... I didn't know there was going to be anything added on "Estimated Prophet". Nonetheless, Weir worked with the producer that summer, taking advantage of an offer by Davis to record his second solo album, Heaven Help the Fool, for Arista.

Release
The cover artwork was produced by Kelley/Mouse Studios, who had created several previous works for the band. Though a terrapin appears in the lyrics only as a place name, dancing terrapins feature prominently in the artwork and afterward became part of the large iconography associated with the Grateful Dead. The front cover image takes the idea of a "terrapin station" literally. The back cover features a stylized, one-eyed skull with a crossed bone, feathers and roses, in keeping with the imagery that had evolved around the Dead.

Though the heavy sound production was of its time, it was unusual for a Grateful Dead album and a departure from their earlier, edgier psychedelic albums or their more recent americana or jazz-blues efforts. Garcia said Olsen had "put the Grateful Dead in a dress". Unhappy with the string sections and choirs on the title suite, he complained "It made me mad. He and Paul Buckmaster had an erroneous rhythmic sense; they changed it from a dotted shuffle to a marching  time." Lesh said "The orchestral and choral sweeteners added to the title sequence by Olsen and Buckmaster were a classic example of gilding the lily." Reaction to the production from both fans and critics was similar, with a more positive response to the songs themselves.

A vehicular accident involving drummer Mickey Hart prevented a summer tour supporting the release of Terrapin Station, and while Weir returned to the studio with Olsen, Garcia focused on exhibiting The Grateful Dead Movie, and the Jerry Garcia Band and Cats Under the Stars. All of the songs on the album were played live, with "Terrapin Station",  "Estimated Prophet" and "Samson and Delilah" staying in concert rotation until the dissolution of the band, usually as part of the second set. After its reappearance, "Dancin' in the Street" was played frequently while Donna Godchaux remained in the band, after which it was performed sporadically until 1987. She also sang "Sunrise" during the rest of her tenure. "Terrapin Station Part 1" was never performed live in full. The first three sections (known live as "Terrapin Station") remained on set lists, with the third generally extended into a climactic focus of the second set. The most complete performance included versions of the "Terrapin Transit", "At a Siding" (without lyrics), and "Terrapin Flyer" sections. It was performed only once (March 18, 1977, at Winterland, San Francisco). Conversely, one performance skipped the "Lady with a Fan" sectionthat of May 22, 1977, at Hollywood Sportatorium in Pembroke Pines (see Dick's Picks Volume 3).

Two singles were released from the album. Davis selected "Dancin' in the Streets" as the first, in a different mix featuring a horn section that Olsen had wanted to add to the album mix. The second single featured "Passenger". Both singles were backed with "Terrapin Station", an excerpt of the album's "Terrapin Part 1" featuring the second section and part of the third (i.e. "Terrapin Station>Terrapin"). Domestic CD copies substitute the album version of "Dancin' in the Streets" with the single mix.

Terrapin Station was first released on CD in 1986. In 2004 it was expanded and remastered for the Beyond Description box set. This version was released individually in 2006. Initial releases did not list time lengths for individual sections of "Terrapin Part 1", though the sections were apparent by style and authorship. Various CD releases break the song down into individual track sections, albeit some with nebulous track boundaries.

Track listing

Personnel

Grateful Dead
Jerry Garcia – guitar, vocals
Donna Jean Godchaux – vocals
Keith Godchaux – keyboards, pianos, synthesizers, vocals
Mickey Hart – drums, vibes
Bill Kreutzmann – drums
Phil Lesh – bass guitar
Bob Weir – guitar, vocals

Additional performers
Paul Buckmaster – orchestral arrangements
The English Choral
The Martyn Ford Orchestra
Tom Scott – lyricon, saxophones on "Estimated Prophet"

Technical personnel
Rick Collins – mastering
Greg Fulginiti – mastering
Keith Olsen – production, engineering

Reissue production credits

James Austin – production
Hugh Brown – design, art direction
Reggie Collins – annotation
Dave Devore – engineering
Jimmy Edwards – associate production
Sheryl Farber – editorial supervision
Tom Flye – mixing
Cornelius "Snookey" Flowers – photography
David Gans – liner notes
Joe Gastwirt – mastering, production consultancy
Robert Gatley – mixing assistance
Robin Hurley – associate production
Eileen Law – research
David Lemieux – production
Mary Ann Mayer – art coordination
Richard McCaffrey – photography
Hale Milgrim – associate production
Robert Minkin – photography
Scott Pascucci – associate production
Ed Perlstein – photography
Cameron Sears – executive production
Peter Simon – photography
Steve Vance – design, art direction

Charts and certifications
Billboard

RIAA Certification

References

External links
The annotated "Terrapin Station"

1977 albums
Albums produced by Keith Olsen
Arista Records albums
Blues rock albums by American artists
Grateful Dead albums
Rhino Records albums
Albums recorded at Trident Studios
Albums arranged by Paul Buckmaster
Albums recorded at Sound City Studios